The Beautiful Lie is an Australian television drama that aired on ABC. The six-part series is a contemporary re-imagining of Leo Tolstoy's classic 1877 novel Anna Karenina. It is directed by Glendyn Ivin and Peter Salmon and produced by Endemol Australia's John Edwards and Imogen Banks. It premiered on Sunday 18 October 2015 at 8:30pm. Screenwriter Alice Bell made the decision to turn Anna and Xander into sports stars to heighten the transgressiveness of a wife leaving her husband.

Cast
 Sarah Snook as Anna Ivin
 Rodger Corser as Xander Ivin
 Sophie Lowe as Kitty Ballantyne
 Celia Pacquola as Dolly Faraday
 Daniel Henshall as Kingsley Faraday
 Benedict Samuel as Skeet Du Pont
 Catherine McClements as Tess Du Pont
 Alexander England as Peter Levin
 Dan Wyllie as Nick Levin
 Robert Menzies as Phillip Ballantyne
 Gina Riley as Catherine Ballantyne

Supporting Cast
 Marlon Williams as Dylan
 Sheena Reyes as Nat
 Lewis Fletcher as Kasper Ivin
 Fiona Harris as Helen

Episodes

Series 1 (2015)

Reception
Melinda Houston found that the changes in society since Anna Karenina made Anna's decision to cheat on her husband seem immature rather than tragic. Michael Idato regards The Beautiful Lie as being superbly cast.

External links
 
 The Beautiful Lie ABC TV website

References

Australian Broadcasting Corporation original programming
2015 Australian television series debuts
English-language television shows
Television series by Endemol Australia